The following radio stations broadcast on FM frequency 89.9 MHz:

Argentina
 Del Sol Viale in Viale, Entre Ríos
 LRS872 Aire Libre in Acebal, Santa Fe
 M90 in Rosario, Santa Fe
 Master in Resistencia, Chaco
 Onda Latina in San Carlos Centro, Santa Fe
 Popular in Joaquín V. González, Salta 
 Profesional in Salta 
 Radio Con Vos in Buenos Aires 
 Radio María in Bahía Blanca, Buenos Aires
 Radio María in Goya, Corrientes
 Radio María in Villaguay, Entre Ríos

Australia
 2VTR in Sydney, New South Wales
 Kiss 90 FM former radio station in Melbourne, Victoria
 3TSC in Melbourne, Victoria
 VL2NI in Burnt Pine, Norfolk Island

Canada (Channel 210)
 CBCU-FM in Chapleau, Ontario
 CBE-FM in Windsor, Ontario
 CBFX-FM-4 in Rouyn, Quebec
 CBLR-FM in Parry Sound, Ontario
 CBPQ-FM in Coquihalla, British Columbia
 CBPR-FM in Revelstoke, British Columbia
 CBTE-FM in Crawford Bay, British Columbia
 CBTU-FM in Tumbler Ridge, British Columbia
 CBTX-FM in Bella Bella, British Columbia
 CBVX-FM-1 in Ste-Anne-de-Beaupre, Quebec
 CFBS-FM in Lourdes-Blanc-Sablon, Quebec
 CFHL-FM in Lansdowne House, Ontario
 CFMR-FM in Meander River, Alberta
 CFNK-FM in Pinehouse Lake, Saskatchewan
 CFWE-FM in Lac La Biche, Alberta
 CHEE-FM in Tobermory, Ontario
 CHEI-FM in South Baymouth, Ontario
 CHII-FM in Brabant, Saskatchewan
 CHIO-FM in Wapekeka, Ontario
 CHIX-FM in Seine River, Ontario
 CHLR-FM in Rigolet, Newfoundland and Labrador
 CHNS-FM in Halifax, Nova Scotia
 CHPN-FM in La Loche, Saskatchewan
 CHTN-FM-2 in St. Edward, Prince Edward Island
 CHWR-FM in Whitesand, Ontario
 CIHT-FM in Ottawa, Ontario
 CIRA-FM-2 in Trois-Rivières, Quebec
 CITK-FM in Obedjiwan, Quebec
 CJAZ-FM in Pelican Narrows, Saskatchewan
 CJBC-FM-2 in Paris, Ontario
 CJCF-FM in Cumberland House, Saskatchewan
 CJCK-FM in Schefferville, Quebec
 CJHL-FM in Hopedale, Newfoundland and Labrador
 CJKX-FM-1 in Sunderland, Ontario
 CJLR-FM in La Ronge, Saskatchewan
 CJLR-FM-1 in Montreal Lake, Saskatchewan
 CJLR-FM-7 in Meadow Lake, Saskatchewan
 CJPL-FM in Postville, Newfoundland and Labrador
 CJPS-FM in Cat Lake, Ontario
 CKCA-FM in Chateh/Assumption, Alberta
 CKFC-FM in North Spirit Lake, Ontario
 CKFN-FM in Ogoki Post, Ontario
 CKID-FM in Constance Lake, Ontario
 CKKE-FM in Mingan, Quebec
 CKKI-FM in Kahnawake, Quebec
 CKMT-FM in Attawapiskat, Ontario
 CKRG-FM in Toronto, Ontario (defunct)
 CKSB-FM in Winnipeg, Manitoba
 CKTC-FM in Red Deer, Alberta
 CKWN-FM in Peawanuck/Winisk, Ontario
 CKWT-FM in Sioux Lookout, Ontario
 CKYW-FM in Summer Beaver, Ontario
 CKZY-FM in Lac Seul/Kejick Bay, Ontario
 VF2084 in Cadotte Lake, Alberta
 VF2085 in Conklin, Alberta
 VF2087 in Fort Chipewyan, Alberta
 VF2090 in John D'Or Prairie, Alberta
 VF2092 in Loon Lake, Alberta
 VF2093 in Zama Lake, Alberta
 VF2176 in Boyer River, Alberta
 VF2177 in Bushe River, Alberta
 VF2178 in Chard/Janvier Reservation, Alberta
 VF2179 in Child Lake, Alberta
 VF2180 in Desmarais/Wabasca, Alberta
 VF2182 in Fort McKay, Alberta
 VF2183 in Goodfish Lake, Alberta
 VF2186 in North Tallcree Reservation, Alberta
 VF2187 in Paddle Prairie, Alberta
 VF2188 in Peavine, Alberta
 VF2191 in South Tallcree Reservation, Alberta
 VF2192 in Sturgeon Lake, Alberta
 VF2201 in Kemano, British Columbia
 VF2241 in Anzac, Alberta
 VF2242 in Beaver Lake, Alberta
 VF2243 in Duncan's Band, Alberta
 VF2244 in Buffalo Lake Settlement, Alberta
 VF2251 in Heart Lake, Alberta
 VF2252 in Horse Lake, Alberta
 VF2254 in Kikino, Alberta
 VF2255 in Peerless Lake, Alberta
 VF2256 in Sandy Lake, Alberta
 VF2257 in Trout Lake, Alberta
 VF2258 in Whitefish/Atikameg, Alberta
 VF2281 in Kangiqsualujjuaq, Quebec
 VF2299 in Fond du Lac Reserve, Saskatchewan
 VF2301 in Shoal Lake Reserve, Saskatchewan
 VF2372 in Moosonee, Ontario
 VF2383 in Cauvet, Quebec
 VF2527 in Sicamous, British Columbia
 VF2553 in Trail, British Columbia
 VF2569 in Merritt, British Columbia
 VF7077 in Regina, Saskatchewan
 VF7301 in Brandon, Manitoba

China 
 CNR Music Radio in Haikou
 CNR The Voice of China in Harbin and Meizhou

Malaysia
 BFM 89.9
 Fly FM in Penang and Taiping, Perak
 Sabah FM in Kota Kinabalu, Sabah
 TraXX FM in Kuching, Sarawak

Mexico
 XHCTN-FM in La Trinitaria, Chiapas
 XHEIN-FM in Cintalapa de Figueroa, Chiapas
 XHEPC-FM in Zacatecas, Zacatecas
 XHHN-FM in Nogales, Sonora
 XHHU-FM in Martínez de la Torre, Veracruz
 XHIB-FM in Caborca, Sonora
 XHITC-FM in Celaya, Guanajuato
 XHJQ-FM in Parras de la Fuente, Coahuila
 XHLP-FM in La Piedad, Michoacán
 XHRA-FM in Guadalajara, Jalisco
 XHRB-FM in Cozumel, Quintana Roo
 XHPEAH-FM in Tapachula, Chiapas
 XHSOL-FM in Mexicali, Baja California
 XHTQS-FM in Tequisquiapan, Querétaro
 XHTXP-FM in Tuxtepec, Oaxaca
 XHUPES-FM in Culiacán, Sinaloa
 XHURI-FM in Urique-Creel, Chihuahua

Japan
 JOIV-FM in Kobe, Hyogo

Netherlands
 3FM in West-Terschelling, Friesland

Philippines
 DWTM in Metro Manila
 DYKI in Cebu City
 DXGN in Davao City
 DWFX in Legazpi City
 DXZB-FM in Zamboanga City

United States (Channel 210)
  in Amarillo, Texas
 KAIG in Dodge City, Kansas
  in Kennett, Missouri
  in Twin Falls, Idaho
  in Burlington, Iowa
 KBDE (FM) in Temple, Texas
 KBFT (FM) in Nett Lake, Minnesota
  in Missoula, Montana
 KBNL in Laredo, Texas
  in Mccall, Idaho
 KBYA in Afton, Wyoming
  in Hayward, California
 KCRW in Santa Monica, California
 KCVG in Hastings, Nebraska
  in Cabool, Missouri
  in Shreveport, Louisiana
 KDFC in Angwin, California
 KDLG-FM in Dillingham, Alaska
  in Del Rio, Texas
  in Dickinson, North Dakota
  in Devils Lake, North Dakota
  in Le Grand, California
 KEUW in Torrington, Wyoming
  in Santa Cruz, California
 KFLV (FM) in Wilber, Nebraska
  in Soledad, California
 KFRY in Pueblo, Colorado
 KGHP in Gig Harbor, Washington
  in Arnold, Missouri
 KGNV (FM) in Washington, Missouri
 KGPR in Great Falls, Montana
  in Auburn, Washington
 KGRJ in Chamberlain, South Dakota
 KHCF in Morgan Hill, California
 KHIS in Jackson, Missouri
 KHSG in Garberville, California
 KINU in Kotzebue, Alaska
 KIPL in Lihue, Hawaii
  in Fort Bragg, California
 KJEM in Pullman, Washington
 KJIH in Manhattan, Kansas
  in Rapid City, South Dakota
  in Flagstaff, Arizona
 KJTW in Jamestown, North Dakota
  in Redmond, Oregon
 KKWE in White Earth, Minnesota
  in College Station, Texas
 KLKI in Bullhead City, Arizona
 KLVA in Superior, Arizona
  in Alexandria, Louisiana
  in High Point, Missouri
 KMOJ in Minneapolis, Minnesota
 KMWC in Bethany, Missouri
 KORU in Garapan-Saipan, Northern Marianas Islands
 KPCO-FM in Cooper, Texas
 KPCY-LP in Lake Providence, Louisiana
  in Wenatchee, Washington
  in Vail, Colorado
  in Portland, Oregon
 KQNV in Fallon, Nevada
 KQVI-FM in Cedar Lake, Texas
 KQXB in Breckenridge, Texas
 KRBX in Caldwell, Idaho
 KRGM in Marshall, Minnesota
 KRJE in Hawkeye, Iowa
  in Rochester, Minnesota
  in Pittsburg, Kansas
  in Saint Martinville, Louisiana
 KTAD in Sterling, Colorado
 KTHF in Hammon, Oklahoma
  in Cuero, Texas
  in Montrose, Colorado
 KTPR in Stanton, Texas
 KTSW in San Marcos, Texas
  in Fairbanks, Alaska
 KUKL (FM) in Kalispell, Montana
 KUNM in Albuquerque, New Mexico
  in Cave City, Arkansas
 KWAR in Waverly, Iowa
 KWCN in Pinedale, Wyoming
 KWHA in West Helena, Arkansas
  in Grandfield, Oklahoma
 KXIR in Freeland, Washington
 KXPE-LP in Austin, Texas
 KXSW in Sisseton, South Dakota
  in Alamogordo, New Mexico
 KYEP-LP in Eagle Pass, Texas
 KYMS in Rathdrum, Idaho
 KYPC in Colstrip, Montana
 KYPM in Livingston, Montana
 KZIC in Hondo, Texas
  in Sheffield, Alabama
  in Torrington, Connecticut
  in Vincennes, Indiana
 WAYW in New Johnsonville, Tennessee
 WBKV in Buffalo, New York
 WCBU in Peoria, Illinois
 WCDE in Elkins, West Virginia
 WCGV in Cambridge Springs, Pennsylvania
  in Barre, Vermont
  in Palm City, Florida
 WCXB in Benton Harbor, Michigan
 WDAV in Davidson, North Carolina
  in Greenville, Ohio
  in Clinton, Tennessee
 WEGT in Greensburg, Indiana
  in Blue Hill, Maine
  in Memphis, Tennessee
 WGLG in Swanton, Vermont
  in Hanna, Indiana
  in West Lafayette, Indiana
 WHRJ in Washington Court House, Virginia
  in Brule, Wisconsin
 WHSF in Rhinelander, Wisconsin
  in Trout Lake, Michigan
  in Jacksonville, Florida
  in Woodbine, New Jersey
 WJTF in Panama City, Florida
  in Beaufort, South Carolina
  in New York, New York
  in Kalamazoo, Michigan
  in Georgetown, Kentucky
 WKWR in Key West, Florida
  in Godfrey, Illinois
  in West Chester, Ohio
  in Traverse City, Michigan
  in Mattoon, Illinois
  in Mississippi State, Mississippi
 WMLG in Guayanilla, Puerto Rico
  in Lexington, Virginia
  in Emmitsburg, Maryland
  in Manahawkin, New Jersey
  in Sweet Briar, Virginia
  in Elkton, Maryland
 WOMB in Ellettsville, Indiana
  in Esperance, New York
  in Madison, Wisconsin
 WPIR in Culpeper, Virginia
  in Hartford, Connecticut
 WRIM in Cookeville, Tennessee
 WRRD in Greensboro, Georgia
 WRRO in Edon, Ohio
  in Oswego, New York
  in Elizabeth City, North Carolina
  in Springfield, Massachusetts
 WSOF in Madisonville, Kentucky
 WSUF in Noyack, New York
 WSWS (FM) in Smithboro, Illinois
  in Gadsden, Alabama
  in Holland, Michigan
 WTLR in State College, Pennsylvania
 WTSU in Montgomery-Troy, Alabama
  in Orlando, Florida
  in Fond du Lac, Wisconsin
  in Scranton, Pennsylvania
 WVKJ in Dublin, New Hampshire
 WVNP in Wheeling, West Virginia
  in Radford, Virginia
  in Huntington, West Virginia
 WWNO in New Orleans, Louisiana
 WWSP in Stevens Point, Wisconsin
 WWVT-FM in Ferrum, Virginia
  in North Creek, New York
 WXTR in Tappahannock, Virginia
  in Wakarusa, Indiana
 WYFR-LP in Fairhope, Alabama
 WZCO in Chadbourn, North Carolina
 WZTN in Cornersville, Tennessee

References

Lists of radio stations by frequency